The Parish Church and Sanctuary of Our Lady of Graces is a Roman Catholic parish church in Żabbar, Malta, dedicated to Our Lady of Graces. The church was originally built between 1641 and 1696 to designs of the Renaissance architect Tommaso Dingli. Its façade, an outstanding example of Maltese Baroque architecture, was built in 1738 to designs of Giovanni Bonavia. The dome was rebuilt in the early 19th century after it had been damaged during the French blockade of 1798–1800, and it was rebuilt again in the first half of the 20th century to designs of Giuseppe Pace.

History
A shrine dedicated to Our Lady of Graces existed in Żabbar since at least the 16th century, and it was sacked by the Ottomans during a raid in 1614. The town became a parish in 1615, and the present church was constructed between 1641 and 1696, to designs of the architect Tommaso Dingli. The main aisle was complete by 1658, and the old church was retained as a sacristy. The church was decorated with an altarpiece painted by Alessio Erardi in 1715, and the interior was fully complete by 1723. The church radically altered in 1738, when its façade was rebuilt in the Baroque style to designs of Giovanni Bonavia. The church was dedicated on 31 October 1784. This has been hailed as one of the best examples of Maltese Baroque architecture.

During the French blockade of 1798–1800, Żabbar was held by Maltese insurgents, and it was repeatedly bombarded by French forces from the nearby Cottonera Lines. During one of the bombardments in November 1799, a cannon ball hit the church's dome, and a woman was killed by falling stones. Meanwhile, Maltese insurgents built an artillery battery near the church in order to bombard French positions. After the blockade was over, the dome had to be completely rebuilt due to the damage it had sustained, while the right belfry had also suffered considerable damage and it was also repaired in 1801.

In 1926, the dome was rebuilt again and side chapels were constructed to designs of Giuseppe Pace. In 1951, the church's altarpiece was crowned by Archbishop Mikiel Gonzi, and in 2001 a silver diadem was placed on it by Archbishop Joseph Mercieca.

The church is scheduled as a Grade 1 national monument, and it is also listed on the National Inventory of the Cultural Property of the Maltese Islands.

Architecture
The church has a cruciform plan with three bay naves. It has two bell towers that have a pyramidal spire, a large dome and smaller ones on the transepts.

The church's façade includes a colonnaded portico having rectangular recesses topped by an entablature, a cornice and balustrades. The façade is divided into three bays by flat pilasters topped by Corinthian capitals. It is further divided into tiers, with the middle one containing three apertures, with a window in the centre and statues on either side. The central bay has a scrolled pedestal and a cross.

Żabbar Sanctuary Museum

The Żabbar parish maintains a museum housed in a purposely-built building adjacent to the church. The museum was established in 1954, and it contains many artifacts, both religious and secular. Its key holdings include a collection of ex-voto paintings which were offered to Our Lady of Graces, two sedan chairs which were used by Grand Masters in the 17th and 18th centuries, and paintings and other works of art that were formerly located in the sanctuary and in other churches and chapels in Żabbar.

References

External links

Żabbar
17th-century Roman Catholic church buildings in Malta
Limestone churches in Malta
Renaissance architecture in Malta
Baroque church buildings in Malta
Roman Catholic churches completed in 1696
Roman Catholic churches completed in 1738
National Inventory of the Cultural Property of the Maltese Islands